Gravel  is a loose aggregation of rock fragments. Gravel occurs naturally throughout the world as a result of sedimentary and erosive geologic processes; it is also produced in large quantities commercially as crushed stone.

Gravel is classified by particle size range and includes size classes from granule- to boulder-sized fragments. In the Udden-Wentworth scale gravel is categorized into granular gravel and pebble gravel. ISO 14688 grades gravels as fine, medium, and coarse, with ranges 2–6.3 mm to 20–63 mm. One cubic metre of gravel typically weighs about 1,800 kg (or a cubic yard weighs about 3,000 lb).

Gravel is an important commercial product, with a number of applications. Almost half of all gravel production is used as aggregate for concrete. Much of the rest is used for road construction, either in the road base or as the road surface (with or without asphalt or other binders.) Naturally occurring porous gravel deposits have a high hydraulic conductivity, making them important aquifers.

Definition and properties

Colloquially, the term gravel is often used to describe a mixture of different size pieces of stone mixed with sand and possibly some clay. The American construction industry distinguishes between gravel (a natural material) and crushed stone (produced artificially by mechanical crushing of rock.)

The technical definition of gravel varies by region and by area of application. Gravel is sometimes distinguished from rubble, which is loose rock particles in the same size range but angular in shape. This corresponds to all particles with sizes between coarse sand and cobbles.

ISO 14688 for soil engineering grades gravels as fine, medium, and coarse with ranges 2 mm to 6.3 mm to 20 mm to 63 mm.

Natural gravel has a high hydraulic conductivity, sometimes reaching above 1 cm/s.

Origin
Most gravel is derived from disintegration of bedrock as it weathers. Quartz is the most common mineral found in gravel, as it is hard, chemically inert, and lacks cleavage planes along which the rock easily splits. Exceptions include quartz veins, pegmatites, deep intrusions, and high-grade metamorphic rock. The rock fragments are rapidly rounded as they are transported by rivers, often within a few tens of kilometers of their source outcrops.

Gravel is deposited as gravel blankets or bars in stream channels; in alluvial fans; in near-shore marine settings, where the gravel is supplied by streams or erosion along the coast; and in the deltas of swift-flowing streams.

It has been suggested that wind-formed (aeolian) gravel "megaripples" in Argentina have counterparts on the planet Mars.

Production and uses

Gravel is a major basic raw material in construction. Sand is not usually distinguished from gravel in official statistics, but crushed stone is treated as a separate category. In 2020, sand and gravel together made up 23% of all industrial mineral production in the U.S., with a total value of about $12.6 billion. Some 960 million tons of construction sand and gravel were produced. This greatly exceeds production of industrial sand and gravel (68 million tons), which is mostly sand rather than gravel.

It is estimated that almost half of construction sand and gravel is used as aggregate for concrete. Other important uses include in road construction, as road base or in blacktop; as construction fill; and in myriad minor uses.

Gravel is widely and plentifully distributed, mostly as river deposits, river flood plains, and glacial deposits, so that environmental considerations and quality dictate whether alternatives, such as crushed stone, are more economical. Crushed stone is already displacing natural gravel in the eastern United States, and recycled gravel is also becoming increasingly important.

Etymology
The word gravel comes from the Old French gravele or gravelle.

Types

Types of gravel include:

Bank gravel naturally deposited gravel intermixed with sand or clay found in and next to rivers and streams.  Also known as "bank run" or "river run".
Bench gravel a bed of gravel located on the side of a valley above the present stream bottom, indicating the former location of the stream bed when it was at a higher level. The term is most commonly used in Alaska and the Yukon Territory.
Crushed stone rock crushed and graded by screens and then mixed to a blend of stones and fines. It is widely used as a surfacing for roads and driveways, sometimes with tar applied over it. Crushed stone may be made from granite, limestone, dolomite, and other rocks. Also known as "crusher run", DGA (dense grade aggregate) QP (quarry process), and shoulder stone. Crushed stone is distinguished from gravel by the U.S. Geological Survey.
Fine gravel gravel consisting of particles with a diameter of 
Stone dust fine, crushed, gravel from the final stage of screen separation, such that the gravel is not separated out from fine dust particles. As with other forms of crushed stone, this is distinguished from gravel by the U.S. Geological Survey.
Lag gravel a surface accumulation of coarse gravel produced by the removal of finer particles.
Pay gravel also known as "pay dirt"; a nickname for gravel with a high concentration of gold and other precious metals. The metals are recovered through gold panning.
Pea gravel also known as "pea shingle" is clean gravel similar in size to garden peas. Used for concrete surfaces, walkways, driveways and as a substrate in home aquariums.
Piedmont gravel a coarse gravel carried down from high places by mountain streams and deposited on relatively flat ground, where the water runs more slowly.
Plateau gravel a layer of gravel on a plateau or other region above the height at which stream-terrace gravel is usually found.

Relationship to plant life
In locales where gravelly soil is predominant, plant life is generally more sparse. This is due to  the inferior ability of gravels to retain moisture, as well as the corresponding paucity of mineral nutrients, since finer soils that contain such minerals are present in smaller amounts.

In the geologic record
Sediments containing over 30% gravel that become lithified into solid rock are termed conglomerate. Conglomerates are widely distributed in sedimentary rock of all ages, but usually as a minor component, making up less than 1% of all sedimentary rock. Alluvial fans likely contain the largest accumulations of gravel in the geologic record. These include conglomerates of the Triassic basins of eastern North America and the New Red Sandstone of south Devon.

See also
 Construction aggregate
 Melon gravel
 Pebble
 Rock

References

External links

 
 

Sedimentology
Building stone
Natural materials
Pavements
Gardening aids
Stone (material)
Soil-based building materials